Ranga The Donga is a 2010 Indian Telugu-language action drama film directed by G. V. Sudhakar Naidu. It stars Srikanth, Ramya Krishna and Vimala Raman. The film was released on 30 December 2010.

Plot
Ranga (Srikanth) is a thief who lives in Stuart Nagar. He was raised by his grandmother (Sakuntala) in her house. He used to steal from corrupt police officers because they could not file a complaint for the theft of money from their own houses. He would steal money and valuables by spraying a sedative called chloroform in their houses. He would also steal the stars on their police uniforms to prove that the individual is unworthy of the stars on their shoulders. Ranga is a fan of faction-oriented films, and dreams of acting like one of those faction leaders. At the same time, he falls in love with a sub-inspector, Mangamma (Vimala Raman). At one point, Ranga and friends try to rob the police commissioner's (Nagendra Babu) house, but are caught. While they were at court, Ranga meets a real faction leader, Bhavani Prasad (Srikanth). Bhavani's rival attacks him severely, leading to his death. However, noticing that Ranga looks exactly like Bhavani, the latter's wife (Ramya Krishnan) convinces him to take her late husband's place to prove to everyone that he indeed is alive. Ranga realizes that he is in reality Bhavani Prasad's own brother, and is happy that he was finally able to act like a real faction leader.

Cast

 Srikanth as Ranga / Bhavani Prasad
 Ramya Krishna as Bhavani Prasad's wife
 Vimala Raman as Inspector Mangamma
 Telangana Shakuntala
 G. V. Sudhakar Naidu
 Jaya Prakash Reddy
 Nagendra Babu as Police Commissioner
 Chitram Seenu
 Jyothi
 Bhuvaneswari
 Sakshi Shivanand
 Suman Setty
 Chalapathi Rao
 Tirupathi Prakash
 Sivaji Raja

Soundtrack

Critical reception
123 Telugu wrote, "Ranga The Donga might have something for those who love to watch Srikanth, come what may. Focusing on the ‘garnishing’, the makers somehow lost the true essence of their ‘recipe’". Cinegoer mentioned, "If you were looking for some bright spots in Ranga The Donga, it's like asking Telangana lovers to keep the State integrated. Better luck to the audiences."

References

External links
 http://www.bharatmovies.com/hindi/info/meri-warrant.htm
 - YouTube

2010s Telugu-language films
2010 films
2010 masala films
Films scored by Chakri
Indian action drama films
2010 action drama films